The first inauguration of William McKinley as the 25th president of the United States took place on Thursday, March 4, 1897, in front of the Old Senate Chamber at the United States Capitol, Washington, D.C. This was the 28th inauguration and marked the commencement of the first, and eventually only full term of William McKinley as president and the only term of Garret Hobart as vice president. Chief Justice Melville Fuller administered the presidential oath of office. This was the first inauguration to be recorded on film, and was the last presidential inauguration to take place in the 19th century. Hobart died  into this term, and the office remained vacant since there was no constitutional provision which allow an intra-term vice-presidential office filling; it would be regulated by the Twenty-fifth Amendment in 1967.

Gallery

See also
Presidency of William McKinley
Second inauguration of William McKinley
1896 United States presidential election

References

External links

 Text of McKinley's First Inaugural Address

United States presidential inaugurations
1897 in Washington, D.C.
1897 in American politics
Inauguration
March 1897 events